Rakshina is a rural locality (a village) in Leninskoye Rural Settlement, Kudymkarsky District, Perm Krai, Russia. The population was 124 as of 2010. There are nine streets.

Geography 
Rakshina is located 42 km south of Kudymkar (the district's administrative centre) by road. Filayeva is the nearest rural locality.

References 

Rural localities in Kudymkarsky District